Modesto Omiste is a province in the south of the Bolivian Potosí Department. Its capital is Villazón. The province is named after the Bolivian writer and politician Modesto Omiste Tinajeros.

Location
Modesto Omiste province is one of sixteen provinces in the Potosí Departament. It is located between 21° 39' and 22° 06' South and between 65° 10' and 66° 08' West. In the north it borders Sud Chichas Province, in the east Tarija Department, in the south and south-west the Republic of Argentina. The province extends over 120 km from east to west and 65 km from north to south.

Division
The province comprises only one municipality (municipio), Villazón Municipality which is identical to the province. It was named after the Bolivian president Eliodoro Villazón

The province is further subdivided into cantons (cantones):
Berque
Casira
Chagua
Chipihuayco
Mojo
Moraya
Sagnasti
Salitre
San Pedro de Sococha
Sarcari
Sococha
Villazón
Yuruma

Population
The main language of the province is Spanish, spoken by 97%, while 44% of the population speak Quechua. The population rose from 31,737 (1992 census) to 36,266 (2001 census), an increase of 14.3%.

44% of the population have no access to electricity, 54% have no sanitary facilities. 18% of the population are employed in agriculture, 11% in industry, 71% in general services. 84% of the population are Catholics, 11% Protestants.

Most of the people are not indigenous, 43,3% are citizens of Quechua descent.

References 

Population data (Spanish)

External links 
 Villazón Municipality (= Modesto Omiste Province): population data and map (PDF; 628 kB) (Spanish)

 

Provinces of Potosí Department